Lanark Burghs (also known as Linlithgow Burghs) was a district of burghs constituency of the House of Commons of the Parliament of the United Kingdom (at Westminster) from 1708 to 1832, representing a seat for one Member of Parliament (MP).

There was also a later Lanark county constituency, from 1918 to 1983.

Creation
The British parliamentary constituency was created in 1708 following the Acts of Union, 1707 and replaced the former Parliament of Scotland burgh constituencies of Linlithgow, Lanark, Peebles and Selkirk.

Boundaries

The constituency covered four burghs: Linlithgow in the county of Linlithgow, Lanark in the county of Lanark, Peebles in the county of Peebles, and Selkirk in the county of Selkirk.

History
The constituency elected one Member of Parliament (MP) by the first past the post system until the seat was abolished for the 1832 general election.

For the 1832 general election, as a result of the Representation of the People (Scotland) Act 1832, Peebles was merged into the county constituency of Peeblesshire, Selkirk was merged into the county constituency of Selkirkshire, and the remaining burghs were combined with Airdrie and Hamilton, both in the county of Lanark, to form Falkirk Burghs. At the same time, however, the boundaries of burghs for parliamentary election purposes ceased be necessarily those for other purposes.

Members of Parliament

Elections in the 1830s

Elections in the 1820s

Notes and references 

Historic parliamentary constituencies in Scotland (Westminster)
Constituencies of the Parliament of the United Kingdom established in 1708
Constituencies of the Parliament of the United Kingdom established in 1832
Politics of South Lanarkshire
Lanark
Politics of the Scottish Borders
Politics of West Lothian
1708 establishments in Scotland
1832 disestablishments